The year 1968 in archaeology involved some significant events.

Explorations
Survey of Anshan in Iran.

Excavations
 Anne Stine Ingstad and Helge Ingstad complete excavations of Viking site at L'Anse aux Meadows.
 Prof. Richard J. C. Atkinson undertakes work at Silbury, broadcast on BBC Television (continues to 1970).
 Colin Renfrew begins excavations at Sitagroi, Greece (continues to 1970).

Publications
 Sally R. and Lewis R. Binford (ed.) - New Perspectives in Archeology.
 David L. Clarke - Analytical Archaeology.

Finds
 Archaeological prospection of Buvuma Island directed by the Tervuren Museum finds early use of pottery.
 An early medieval burial excavated at Suontaka Vesitorninmäki, Hattula, in southern Finland includes the Suontaka sword among ambiguous features of gender expression; research published in 2021 suggests the individual buried had Klinefelter syndrome.
 The lower jaw part of a presumably female Homo heidelbergensis pre-Neanderthal (azykantrop) is found in the acheulean age layer in Azykh cave, in Azerbaijan.
 The Inscription of Sargon II at Tang-i Var

Awards

Miscellaneous
 June 26 - Pope Paul VI claims that bones discovered in the vicinity of Saint Peter's tomb in 1942 are relics of Peter.
 Project to move temples of Abu Simbel to prevent their inundation by the Aswan High Dam successfully completed.
 The Egyptian Department of Antiquities and the Getty Conservation Institute in Santa Monica, California start a conservation project for tomb of Queen Nefertari.
 Analysis of the environment of Shanidar Cave in Kurdistan suggests that the adult male Neanderthal "Shanidar 4" may have been buried with floral tributes.

Births

Deaths
 December 18 - Dorothy Garrod, English Palaeolithic archaeologist of the Near East (born 1892).

References

Archaeology
Archaeology
Archaeology by year